Riga is an assembly constituency in Sitamarhi district in the Indian state of Bihar.

Overview
As per Delimitation of Parliamentary and Assembly constituencies Order, 2008, 23. Riga Assembly constituency is composed of the following: Riga, Bairgania and Suppi  community development blocks.

Riga is part of 4. Sheohar (Lok Sabha constituency).

Members of Legislative Assembly

Election results

2020

References

External links
 

Assembly constituencies of Bihar
Politics of Sitamarhi district